The Pearson Field Education Center delivers experiential aviation-based science, technology, engineering, and math (STEM) programs for young people ages kindergarten through 12th grade (K-12) on historic Pearson Field, Vancouver, Washington.

History
PFEC began in the spring of 2013 as a program of the Fort Vancouver National Trust

Pearson Field is the oldest continuously operating airfield in the Pacific Northwest and one of the two oldest continuously operating airfields in the United States, receiving recognition on September 8, 2012 as an American Institute of Aeronautics and Astronautics historic aerospace site.

Dating back to Lincoln Beachey's landing of the Dirigible Gelatine in 1905, Pearson Field was used as a spruce mill for aircraft parts during WWI by the US Army. Established as a forest patrol base in 1921, the site soon became home to regular army flights.  Reserve fliers from the region began training with the 321st Observation Squadron from 1923 until the squadron was placed on active service in 1941. In 1937, first non-stop transpolar flight by the Russian ANT-25 touched down on Pearson Field due to an engine oil leak.

In September 2022, Pearson Field Education Center began operation under Airway Science for Kids, a Portland, OR based 501(c)(3) aviation non-profit.

Programs
PFEC's programs are designed to build a foundational understanding of STEM principles central to flight and to create an appreciation for the historic richness of Pearson Field with its surrounding Historic Reserve. PFEC's goal is to teach hands on skills like understanding of materials and methods used in construction, first-hand experience of actual flight, as well as providing  educational, vocational and career opportunities in STEM/Aviation related fields.

Current programs include school age field trips, Open Saturdays, educational outreach, Scout merit badge programs, Open Cockpit Day, college and career fairs, and aviation connected summer camps. Annually updated summer camp options have included model rocketry build/launch, model R/C aircraft build/fly, model glider build/fly, and supervised time flying an actual aircraft.

PFEC pays particular attention to inclusion of underrepresented minorities through outreach, adaptive program design, and scholarships. Custom program design supporting nearby Washington School for the Blind and Washington State School for the Deaf provides a source of innovation and opportunity for all those served.

Regular celebrations of historic Pearson aviators and aviatrixes including Leah Hing, Edith "Eddie" Foltz Sterns and others are held to foster an empowering and motivational spirit amongst young people participating in PFEC programs.

Location
Pearson Field Education Center is located on historic Pearson Field, 201B East Reserve Street, Vancouver WA, 98661.

Facility
Programs of PFEC are delivered in a 5,700 square foot hangar, on adjacent outdoor grass areas, on and above Pearson Field, on nearby Officers Row, in classrooms of area schools, and at partner organizations. The PFEC hangar includes selected historic aircraft and artifacts supporting curriculum, a simulator lab, hands-on skill building, tool and materials areas, and a classroom environment.

Summer camp programs may include tours of the Western Antique Aeroplane & Automobile Museum in Hood River, Oregon.

References 

Aviation in the United States
Aviation schools
History of aviation
History of Vancouver, Washington